The South-West Conference is a high school athletics conference in Southwestern Connecticut. The conference comprises schools in Fairfield County, Litchfield County, and New Haven County

History
Prior to the 1980s, high school sports leagues in Connecticut tended to be smaller than they are today and were composed of schools that were very close, geographically, and often represented student bodies that were fairly similar in composition. In the late 80s, as a result of an effort by the Commissioner of Education and the Superintendents of many of our school districts, a movement emerged to expand athletic conferences and have them represent schools of greater variety in terms of socio-economic population, racial and ethnic population, and geography. Numerous programs were developed to encourage closer cooperation between urban/suburban communities. As a result of this effort, a number of athletic conferences expanded. 

With the expansion of conferences, many smaller conferences, previously able to schedule a full competitive sports schedule found they were unable to fill out schedules without an extraordinary amount of travel to distant schools. Two such conferences, the WCC (Western Connecticut Conference) and the CCIAC (Cross County Interscholastic Athletic Conference) had developed a close working relationship in order to meet their schedule commitments. In the early 1990s a group of representatives from each of the conferences met to discuss the possibility of formally joining together to form one conference that would meet their respective needs. In 1994, an agreement was reached and began operations in the fall of 1995. The South-West Conference was born. 

The South West Conference established two divisions for its sports programs.  The Colonial Division members represent the larger schools; the Patriot Division members represent the smaller schools.

Colonial Division

Patriot Division

Sports

Fall
Cross Country
Field Hockey
Football
Golf
Soccer
Swimming (Women)
Volleyball

Winter
Basketball
Cheerleading
Gymnastics
Ice Hockey
Indoor Track
Skiing
Swimming (Men)
Wrestling

Spring
Baseball
Lacrosse
Softball 
Tennis
Track and Field
Volleyball (Men)

See also
 Fairfield County Interscholastic Athletic Conference

External links

Sports in Connecticut
Education in Connecticut
High school sports conferences and leagues in the United States
Education in Fairfield County, Connecticut